General elections were held in Liechtenstein in March and April 1890.

Electors 
Electors were selected through elections that were held between 28 March and 3 April. Each municipality had two electors for every 100 inhabitants.

Results 
The election of Oberland's Landtag members and substitutes was held on 12 April in Vaduz. Of Oberland's 114 electors, 113 were present. Oberland elected seven Landtag members and three substitutes.

The election of Unterland's Landtag members and substitutes was held on 16 April in Mauren. All of Unterland's 68 electors were present. Unterland elected five Landtag members and two substitutes.

References 

Liechtenstein
1890 in Liechtenstein
Elections in Liechtenstein
April 1890 events